Harpalus bucharicus is a species of ground beetle in the subfamily Harpalinae. It was described by Tschitscherine in 1898.

References

bucharicus
Beetles described in 1898